Miklós Péterfy is a male former international table tennis player from Hungary.

Table tennis career
He won two medals at the World Table Tennis Championships from 1957 to 1961.

He won a silver medal in the Swaythling Cup (team event) at the 1957 World Table Tennis Championships and a bronze medal at the 1961 World Table Tennis Championships in the Swaythling Cup (men's team event) for Hungary.

See also
 List of table tennis players
 List of World Table Tennis Championships medalists

References

Hungarian male table tennis players
World Table Tennis Championships medalists
20th-century Hungarian people